Rahman Buğra Çağıran (born 1 January 1995) is a Turkish footballer who plays as a midfielder for Yeni Malatyaspor.

Professional career
Rahman moved to Yeni Malatyaspor in 2016 after successful spell in the lower divisions with Arsinspor. Rahman made his professional debut for Yeni Malatyaspor in a 1–1 Süper Lig tie with Antalyaspor on 26 August 2017.

References

External links

UEFA U17 Profile
Yeni Malatyaspor Profile

1995 births
Sportspeople from Gümüşhane
Living people
Turkish footballers
Turkey youth international footballers
Association football midfielders
Trabzonspor footballers
Arsinspor footballers
Yeni Malatyaspor footballers
Hatayspor footballers
Samsunspor footballers
Büyükşehir Belediye Erzurumspor footballers
Süper Lig players
TFF First League players
TFF Third League players